XHGCY-FM is a community radio station on 106.1 FM in Juchitán de Zaragoza, Oaxaca. It is known as Órbita Digital and owned by the civil association Guna Caa Yuni Xhiña, A.C.

History
Órbita Digital operated as a pirate station until it was raided in November 2014 along with other unlicensed radio stations in the region. The Federal Telecommunications Institute (IFT) later imposed a fine.

In September 2017, weeks after a major earthquake struck Juchitán, the IFT approved a new social community radio concession for Órbita Digital (incorporated as Guna Caa Yuni Xhiña, A.C.). With the concession, the newly minted XHGCY-FM moved to 106.1 MHz.

References

Radio stations in Oaxaca
Community radio stations in Mexico
Radio stations established in 2017